Barbara E. Adam,  (born 3 May 1945) is a retired British sociologist and academic. She specialises in social theory particularity in reference to time. From 1988 to her retirement in 2011, she lectured at Cardiff University; she was appointed Professor of Sociology in 1999. She was the founding editor of the academic journal Time & Society.

Honours
In 1991, she was awarded the Philip Abrams Memorial Prize by the British Sociological Association for her monograph Time and Social Theory. In 1995, she was awarded the J T Fraser Prize by the International Society for the Study of Time for her monograph Timewatch: The Social Analysis of Time. In 2009, she was elected an Academician of the Academy of Social Sciences (AcSS); in 2014, Academicians were retitled Fellows (FAcSS) to bring the Academy of Social Sciences inline with other British learned societies.

Selected works

References

1945 births
Living people
British sociologists
British women sociologists
Sociology educators
Fellows of the Academy of Social Sciences
Academics of Cardiff University